Arizona Heat is a 1988 American crime-thriller film directed by John G. Thomas and starring Michael Parks, Denise Crosby, Hugh Farrington.

Premise
A tough Arizona cop is teamed with a lesbian cop to catch a serial killer who preys on police.

Cast
 Michael Parks as Detective Lt. Larry Kapinski
 Denise Crosby as Jill Andrews
 Hugh Farrington as Captain Samuels
 Ron Briskman as Toad
 Dennis O'Sullivan as Paul Murphy
 Renata Lee as Lisa

References

External links

1988 films
1980s crime thriller films
American crime thriller films
1980s English-language films
1980s American films